The Battle of Rome Cross Roads, also known as Battle of Rome Crossroads, Skirmish at Rome Crossroads, or Action at Rome Cross-Roads was part of the Atlanta Campaign of the American Civil War. It was fought in Gordon County, Georgia, a short distance west of Calhoun, Georgia, on May 16, 1864. The battle was a limited engagement between Union Army units of the Army of the Tennessee and Confederate States Army units of the Army of Tennessee in the aftermath of the Battle of Resaca, Georgia.

The Battle of Rome Cross Roads ended inconclusively with the Confederate Army units withdrawing. However, the Confederate force achieved the tactical objective of delaying Union Army pursuit. This allowed the Confederate wagon train and separated units of the Confederate force to reach the rendezvous point of Adairsville, Georgia without being overtaken and attacked by Union forces after the Confederates had withdrawn from their defenses around Resaca, Georgia.

Battle 

Union armies of the Military Division of the Mississippi under the command of Major General William T. Sherman engaged the Confederate Army of Tennessee under the command of General Joseph E. Johnston at the Battle of Resaca, Georgia on May 13–15, 1864. After two days of inconclusive but heavy and bloody combat, Union forces outflanked the Confederates by crossing the Oostanaula River, at Lay's Ferry, forcing the Confederates to withdraw from their advanced positions at Resaca. Both the Confederate forces and pursuing Union forces divided into three sections to hasten their movements south.

On May 16, 1864, the Union Army's 2nd Division, commanded by Brigadier General Thomas W. Sweeny, of Major General Grenville M. Dodge's XVI Corps, was the leading unit of the Army of the Tennessee in pursuit of the retreating Confederates of Lieutenant General William J. Hardee's Corp. The 2nd Division of the XVI Corps moved toward the intersection of the Rome-Calhoun Road and the Sugar Valley-Adairsville Road, near Calhoun, Georgia, in an attempt to cut off Hardee's Corps, including Confederate wagon trains. Hardee's Corps and the wagon trains were moving toward a rendezvous at Adairsville, Georgia with the other Confederate units that had withdrawn from Resaca.

General Johnston sent Hardee's Corps to block the Union advance and to protect the Confederate wagon train's withdrawal from Resaca. Hardee’s Corps took up positions in the woods south of the Rome-Calhoun Road near the crossroad and anchored their line on Oothkalooga Creek.

As the leading Union skirmishers, Company G from the 66th Illinois Volunteer Infantry Regiment (Western Sharpshooters), formerly Birge's Western Sharpshooters and later the "Western Sharpshooters-14th Missouri Volunteers", under the command of Captain George Taylor, advanced toward the crossroad, the Confederates launched a surprise attack from the woods. The 24th Georgia Volunteer Infantry Regiment and the 1st Battalion Georgia Sharpshooters and the 16th South Carolina Infantry Regiment led the attack.

The Confederates drove Taylor's men back and killed Taylor as he was trying to steady the defense. Colonel Patrick E. Burke, commander of the 2nd Brigade, 2nd Division, XVI Corps, rushed the other companies of the 66th Illinois Infantry Regiment and the 81st Ohio Infantry Regiment forward to support Company G, which had checked the Confederate advance after Company G had fallen back a short distance following the initial Confederate attack. As he organized the Union regiments, Burke was mortally wounded by a bullet which shattered the bone in his left leg. Lieutenant Colonel Robert N. Adams, commander of the 81st Ohio Infantry Regiment, took command of the brigade and the Union force withdrew a short distance from the battlefield. Then the Confederates directed artillery fire on the Union supply train and empty caissons that were following the leading troops.

The Confederates held their position and delayed the Union advance until the Confederate wagon trains made it through Calhoun, Georgia and were on their way south to Adairsville, Georgia.

Although the Union force suffered only about 50 casualties, the loss of 2nd Brigade, 2nd Division commander, Colonel Patrick E. Burke, formerly commander of the 66th Illinois Infantry Regiment, who was mortally wounded and died soon after the battle, was significant.

Aftermath 

Hardee's Corps withdrew toward Adairsville during the early hours of May 17, 1864. On May 17, 1864, the two armies met in combat again at the Battle of Adairsville, Georgia and in fighting at Rome, Georgia.

Notes

References 
 Barker, Lorenzo A. Blue Acorn Press With the Western Sharpshooters. Huntington, WV: Blue Acorn Press, 1994. 
 Brown, Russel K., Our Connection With Savannah: A History of the 1st Battalion Georgia Sharpshooters, Macon, GA: Mercer University Press, 2004. .
 Brownlee, Clint. War Was Here: Following Sherman's campaign through Georgia. Battle of Rome Crossroads, May 16th, 1864. Posted May 16, 2016. Retrieved April 29, 2018.
  Dyer, Frederick H. A Compendium of the War of Rebellion: Compiled and Arranged From Official Records of the Federal and Confederate Armies, Reports of the Adjutant Generals of the Several States, The Army Registers and Other Reliable Documents and Sources. First published Des Moines, IA: Dyer Publishing Co., 1908. Retrieved April 29, 2008.
 Hitch, Michael G. and Elinor H Mowbray Oh Lordy! : a story of one family's trials during the struggle for southern independence as told through the letters of Private Young H. E. Hitch, Company I, 16th South Carolina Volunteer Infantry. Parker, CO: Outskirts Press, Inc., 2015. .
 White, Lee. Emerging Civil War: The Withdrawal from Resaca. May 16, 2014. Retrieved April 29, 2018.
 Woodworth, Steven E. Nothing but Victory: The Army of the Tennessee, 1861–1865. New York: Alfred A. Knopf, 2005. .

Conflicts in 1864
1864 in Georgia (U.S. state)
Atlanta campaign
Battles of the Western Theater of the American Civil War
Inconclusive battles of the American Civil War
Battles of the American Civil War in Georgia (U.S. state)
Gordon County, Georgia
May 1864 events